In enzymology, a leucyltransferase is an enzyme that catalyzes the chemical reaction

L-leucyl-tRNA + protein  tRNA + L-leucyl-protein

Thus, the two substrates of this enzyme are L-leucyl-tRNA and protein, whereas its two products are tRNA and L-leucyl-protein.

This enzyme belongs to the family of transferases, specifically the aminoacyltransferases.  The systematic name of this enzyme class is L-leucyl-tRNA:protein leucyltransferase. Other names in common use include leucyl, phenylalanine-tRNA-protein transferase, leucyl-phenylalanine-transfer ribonucleate-protein, aminoacyltransferase, and leucyl-phenylalanine-transfer ribonucleate-protein transferase.

Structural studies

References

 
 
 

EC 2.3.2
Enzymes of known structure